Josep Miquel Fernández Codina (born 2 February 1995), commonly known as Xemi, is a Spanish professional footballer who plays for UCAM Murcia CF as a central or attacking midfielder.

Club career

Early career
Born in Sabadell, Barcelona, Catalonia, Xemi joined UE Cornellà's youth setup in 2012, after starting out at CF Damm and CE Sant Gabriel. He made his senior debut in the 2013–14 season at fourth level.

Xemi made his professional debut on 3 September 2014, coming on in the 71st minute of a 0–0 home draw against Real Jaén for the season's Copa del Rey first round. On 29 October 2014, he appeared for 72 minutes of a 1–4 home loss against Real Madrid in the first leg of the fourth round of the domestic cup.

After appearing more regularly during the following campaign in Segunda División B, on 28 December 2015, Xemi signed with FC Barcelona B, in the same division, until 30 June 2017.

Oxford United
On 18 July 2017, after being a regular starter in the Barcelona B-side's promotion to the second level, free agent Xemi signed a three-year contract with League One side Oxford United. He made his debut against Cheltenham Town in the first round of the 2017–18 EFL Cup, scoring in the 42nd minute, though his team would go on to lose 4–3 after extra time. His league debut was as a substitute in a League One game against AFC Wimbledon on 7 October, in which he scored the third goal in a 3–0 victory.  His first League One start came in an away fixture at Southend United on 25 November 2017. On 30 January 2018, Oxford United announced that he had left the club by mutual consent.

Cornellà and Lleida Esportiu
On 31 January 2018, Xemi joined Cornellà until the end of the season. On 9 July signed a two-year contract with Lleida Esportiu.

Club statistics

Personal life
Xemi studies medicine at the Autonomous University of Barcelona. His older brother and sister are both doctors.

References

External links

1995 births
Living people
Sportspeople from Sabadell
Spanish footballers
Footballers from Catalonia
Association football midfielders
Segunda División B players
Tercera División players
CF Damm players
UE Cornellà players
FC Barcelona Atlètic players
Lleida Esportiu footballers
UCAM Murcia CF players
English Football League players
Oxford United F.C. players
Spanish expatriate footballers
Spanish expatriate sportspeople in England
Expatriate footballers in England